Sylvester Commercial Historic District is a historic district in Sylvester, Georgia that was listed on the National Register of Historic Places (NRHP) in 1987.  It includes the Worth County Local Building which is separately NRHP-listed.  Its boundaries were increased in 2002 to include some federally owned property.  The expanded district included 65 contributing buildings and 16 noncontributing buildings.

Prominent resources within the district include:

Sylvester Banking Company (1910), which was Sylvester City Hall in 1987, 101 North Main Street. (see accompanying photo 13).  It is a two-story granite Classical Revival style building, with Corinthian pilasters.
First National Bank of Sylvester (c. 1915), which was WXZE Radio in 1987, 102 North Isabella Street (photo 8).  Neoclassical, with a metal cornice.
Alford Building (c. 1910), 115-119 North Main Street (photo 14).  Largest historic commercial building in Sylvester.  A Masonic Lodge once used the third floor of this three-story red brick Commercial Style building.
Worth County Local Building (1911), 118 North Isabella Street (Photo 6), separately NRHP-listed.  Originally a newspaper office, its architecture is a vernacular version of Beaux-Arts architecture.
C.W. Hillhouse Building (1897), 125 E. Front Street (photo 12). Originally a hardware store.  Asserted to be "the best local example of a late Victorian commercial building."  It has hooded second-story windows and "an elaborate metal cornice".
T.C. Jefford Block (1911-1924), 106-108-110-112 East Kelly Street (photo 2). It has four one-story commercial facades, two with original prism glass over their entrances.
Sylvia Theater (1915), 118 East Kelly Street (photo 1).  First movie theater in Sylvester.  "It has a red brick facade with white marble geometric decorative patterns."

References

Historic districts on the National Register of Historic Places in Georgia (U.S. state)
Neoclassical architecture in Georgia (U.S. state)
Beaux-Arts architecture in Georgia (U.S. state)
National Register of Historic Places in Worth County, Georgia